Radhi may refer to:
Radhi, Bhutan, a village in Trashigang district, eastern Bhutan
Radhi, Mauritania, a village and rural commune